Kocagür can refer to:

 Kocagür, Aydın
 Kocagür, Biga